Étude Op. 25, No. 7 in C-sharp minor is a solo piano technical study composed by Frédéric Chopin in 1834. Markedly different from Chopin's overall scheme of technical virtuosity, this étude focuses instead on perfect sound and phrasing, particularly for the left hand.

Structure 
Étude Op. 25, No. 7 is alternatively known as the "Cello" due to the prominent melody played in the left hand. It is at a Lento tempo, 66 BPM according to the German first edition. Excepting measures 26, 27, and 52, which contain a rapid passage for the left hand, the étude is very straightforward and elementary in rhythm, but not in harmony. The theme is repeated four times throughout the piece; interspersed between are modulated variations of other melodies and cadences.

Notes

External links 

Find an entry on this piece and hear a performance by Artistic Director Arthur Greene at the Chopin Project site
 
 Op. 25, No. 7 played by Ignacy Jan Paderewski 
 Op. 25, No. 7 played by Alfred Cortot
 Op. 25, No. 7 played by Claudio Arrau
 Op. 25, No. 7 played by Tamás Vásáry
 Op. 25, No. 7 played by Vladimir Ashkenazy
 Op. 25, No. 7 played by Ivan Moravec
 Op. 25, No. 7 played by Youri Egorov
 Op. 25, No. 7 played by Murray Perahia

25 07
1834 compositions
Compositions in C-sharp minor